Dagoberto Moll Sequeira (born 22 July 1927) is a Uruguayan former professional football player and manager.

He is remembered for his part in the "Orquesta Canaro", an attacking line of Deportivo de La Coruña in the 1950s formed by Rafael Franco, Tino, Corcuera and Osvaldo. Moll was born in Montevideo. A forward, he played for Deportivo, Barcelona, Celta de Vigo and Elche in La Liga.

He coached Albacete Balompié, SD Compostela, Deportivo de La Coruña, CD Tenerife

References

1927 births
Possibly living people
Association football forwards
Uruguayan footballers
Uruguay international footballers
Uruguayan expatriate footballers
Miramar Misiones players
Deportivo de La Coruña players
FC Barcelona players
RCD Espanyol footballers
RC Celta de Vigo players
Elche CF players
Expatriate footballers in Spain
Uruguayan football managers
Uruguayan expatriate football managers
Girona FC managers
Deportivo de La Coruña managers
Atlante F.C. managers
CD Tenerife managers
Levante UD managers
SD Compostela managers
CD Condal players
Catalonia international guest footballers
Naturalised citizens of Spain
CE L'Hospitalet managers